Mohamed Nadir Hamimid (January 1, 1941 – October 25, 2016) was an Algerian politician. He served as the Algerian Minister of Housing and Urban Affairs from 2004 to 2008.

References

1941 births
2016 deaths
People from Bordj Bou Arréridj Province
Housing ministers
Government ministers of Algeria
21st-century Algerian people